Bekh may refer to:

Places

Bekh, former name for the village Khordzor in Armenia

People
Ivan Bekh (born 1940), Ukrainian professor
Maryna Bekh (born 1995), Ukrainian long jumper